Professor Jean Pouilloux (born 31 October 1917 in Le Vert (Deux-Sèvres), France; died 23 May 1996 at Pimontin (Rhone)) was a French hellenist archaeologist.

He was educated at the École normale supérieure de la rue d’Ulm from 1939 to 1944. He completed his training and made his initial research at the French School at Athens, then was appointed in 1949 to the Faculty of Arts in Lyon. From 1957 to 1985 he was Professor of Greek language, literature and epigraphy at the University of Lyon and the University Lumière Lyon 2. Specialist in archeology and Greek epigraphy, he worked at Delphi, Rhamnus in Attica, the island of Thasos and Cyprus where he founded and directed an archaeological mission. He was a member of the Académie des inscriptions et belles-lettres, several French and foreign academies and in 1988, president of the Institute of France.

His teaching has attracted several generations of students but Jean was not only a teacher. In 1959, he founded within the University of Lyon's Faculty of Arts, the Fernand Courby Institute, named after a Hellenist archaeologist who taught in the same faculty between the two wars. In later years, he created a dynamic team around him, officially recognized by the CNRS in the 1960s. In 1964, he obtained permission to excavate a large archaeological site in Cyprus, the ancient city of Salamis.

Jean Pouilloux was a member of the National Council for Scientific Research, the Universities Advisory Committee, National Council of archaeological research, and for years on the Ministry of Foreign Affairs Committee on the excavations. For four years he chaired the Centre for Archaeological Research at CNRS in Sophia-Antipolis. The culmination of his activity was the creation in 1975 of the Maison de l'Orient et de la Méditerranée where he served as director until 1978. In 1976, he was appointed scientific director of humanities at the CNRS for six years. He was also notable for translation of Jewish-Greek literature in the 1960s, collaborating with Roger Arnaldez to publish works of Philo of Alexandria, of which he personally translated four volumes.

Positions held
 1944-1945 - Professor at the Lycée d’Angers
 1945-1949 - Member of the French School of Athens
 1951-1954 - Assistant of ancient history at the Faculty of Arts, Lyon
 1954 - Member of the French School of Athens
 1955-1957 - Lecturer at the Faculty of Arts of Besançon
 1957-1985 - Senior Lecturer, then Professor at the Faculty of Arts of Lyon and University Lyon 2
 1959 - Founder and Director of the Institute Fernand Courby
 1964-1972 - Director of the French archaeological mission of Salamis in Cyprus
 1970 - Corresponding Member of the German Archaeological Institute
 1972-1976 - President of the Center for Archaeological Research of the National Centre for Scientific Research
 1972 - Member of the Academy of Sciences, Humanities and Arts of Lyon
 1975 - Founder of the Maison de l'Orient et de la Méditerranée, originally called "Maison de l’Orient méditerranéen ancien"
 1975-1978 - Director of Maison de l’Orient et de la Méditerranée
 1975 - Member of the Academy of Athens
 1976 - Corresponding member of the Greek Archaeological Society
 1976 - Doctor Honoris Causa from the University of Thessaloniki
 1976-1982 - Scientific Director of Humanities at the National Center for Scientific Research
 1978 - Member of the l’Académie des inscriptions et belles lettres
 1979 - Member of the Academy of Bordeaux
 1988 - President of the l’Académie des inscriptions et belles lettres
 1988 - President of the Institut de France
 1986 - Chairman of the Foundation for the Lexicon Iconographicum Mythologiae Classicae (LIMC)
 1982-1991 - President of the Association des amis des sources chrétiennes
 1988 - President of the Association of Association des amis de la Maison de l’Orient
 1989 - Doctor Honoris Causa from the University of Montreal
 1990 - Foreign Member Emeritus of the Archaeological Institute of America (Boston)

Selected bibliography
 Choix d'inscriptions grecques, 1st edition, 1960, University of Lyon Press, later edition by the Académie des inscriptions et belles-lettres « Epigraphica », 2003.
 De agricultura, Philo of Alexandria, Translation, Cerf, coll. « Sources chrétiennes » : n° 9, 1961.
 De plantatione, Philo of Alexandria, Translation, Cerf, coll. « Sources chrétiennes » :n° 10, 1961.
 De vita Mosis, I-II, Philo of Alexandria, Translation, Cerf, coll. « Sources chrétiennes » : n° 22, 1967.
 De æternitate mundi, Philo of Alexandria, Translation, Cerf, coll. « Sources chrétiennes » :n° 30, 1969.
 collaboration : Nouveau choix d'inscriptions grecques, 1st edition in 1971, University of Lyon Press, later edition by the Académie des inscriptions et belles-lettres « Epigraphica », 2005.
 ΑΛΕΞΑΝΔΡΙΝΑ. Hellénisme, judaïsme et christianisme à Alexandrie, mélanges offerts au P. Claude Mondésert, Cerf, 1987.
 Preface : La Collection « Sources chrétiennes ». Éditer les Pères de l'Église au XXe siècle, Cerf, 1995.

External links
 Interview with Jean Pouilloux in the CNRS Archives.

References

French archaeologists
People from Deux-Sèvres
Historians of antiquity
Hellenic epigraphers
École Normale Supérieure alumni
Members of the Académie des Inscriptions et Belles-Lettres
1917 births
1996 deaths
French epigraphers
20th-century French historians
20th-century archaeologists